Arechis II (also Aretchis, Arichis, Arechi or Aregis) (born  – died 26 August 787) was a Duke of Benevento, in Southern Italy. He sought to expand the Beneventos' influence into areas of Italy that were still under Byzantine control, but he also had to defend against Charlemagne, who had conquered northern Italy.

Genealogy 
Arechis was descended from the Lombards, who had invaded the Italian peninsula in the late sixth century. The Lombards established their kingdom in northern Italy. Its capital was at Pavia, and it also included two independent southern duchies—the Spoleto and Benevento.

Arechis was the son of Duke Liutprand, whom he succeeded in 758. Arechis continued to use the title duke of Benevento until the Lombard kingdom fell to Charlemagne in 774. Arechis adopted the title prince of Benevento after the fall of the kingdom—probably as a gesture of independence—and continued to use it until his death in 787.

Family 

Around 757, Arechis married Adelperga, a daughter of the northern Lombard king Desiderius. Arechis established friendly—but largely independent—relations with Desiderius. This lasted until 774, when the Lombard kingdom fell to the Franks and Desiderius was deposed. The Beneventan couple produced five children: three boys and two girls.

Cultural contributions 
By eighth century standards, Adelperga and Arechis were notable patrons of culture. Adelperga commissioned the major Lombard writer Paul the Deacon to produce his Historia Romana, a textbook of Roman history which was widely used during the rest of the Middle Ages. Some historians also argue that they commissioned Paul's more famous  Historia gentis Langobardorum although this is uncertain. Arechis arranged for the transfer of saints' relics to the newly commissioned church  of Santa Sofia in Benevento. The church still survives, albeit heavily restored. It is decorated with rare eighth-century frescoes.

Arechis also put resources into building projects in Salerno, including a new palace and castle. Salerno became an increasingly important port city during Arechis' reign. Major southern monasteries, such as Montecassino and San Vincenzo al Volturno also received substantial donations from him.

Political activities 

Arechis was duke when Charlemagne conquered the north Italian Lombard kingdom in 774. Although Arechis refused to submit when Charlemagne made himself king of the Lombards, Benevento was left largely unmolested. That same year Arechis adopted the title of "prince of Benevento". He also issued a handful of laws. Both these acts were probably intended as a gesture of defiance against Charlemagne—until this time only the Lombard kings had enacted laws. Since Charlemagne now styled himself king of the Lombards, Arechis was effectively rejecting Charlemagne's right to this title.

In November 774, immediately after being solemnly crowned Prince, Arechi II decided to send members of the Cortisani and Baccari families to occupy the middle area of the Biferno river, naming them as gestalds, the official royal authority in the area.

In 776, Arechis was probably involved in a Lombard conspiracy to throw off Frankish domination. Charlemagne successfully crushed this revolt, which was mostly focused in northeastern Friuli. Arechis does not seem to have provided much practical support for the rebellion and Charlemagne was forced to hurry back north of the Alps, rather than dealing with Arechis. Once again, geographical distance had protected Arechis from the Franks.

Arechis' Beneventan state continued to skirmish with and try to seize territory from the neighbouring Byzantine duchy of Naples. At some point, however, perhaps in the mid-780s, Arechis reached an agreement with the duke of Naples set out in a document called a pactum. This agreement sets forth detailed provisions dealing with landholding and dispute settlement. It may have been intended to relieve Benevento, which was facing the looming Frankish threat.

This crystallised in 787, when Charlemagne advanced into south Italy and besieged Capua, an important town in the principality of Benevento. Arechis left Benevento itself and retreated to his new centre, the port of Salerno. Under pressure, Arechis apparently submitted to Frankish suzerainty. As Einhard, Charlemagne's biographer, describes it in his Vita Caroli Magni:

Superficially, Charlemagne seemed to have imposed himself on Benevento. Arechis had paid tribute and one of his sons was being held hostage as a guarantee of Benevento's loyalty. Frankish influence was also given formal expression. Traditionally Benevento had produced and used gold coinage, but from 787 the Beneventan mint began to strike silver coins too. The new coins were similar to those issued by Charlemagne's Frankish kingdom. Both the new silver and the traditional gold coins, as well as Beneventan legal documents, all started to include Charlemagne's name and title alongside those of Arechis. The inclusion of titles on coins and in charters was considered an important marker of political authority.

However, Einhard overstates Charlemagne's success. Frankish influence in Benevento proved to be very short-lived. In 788, both Grimoald's elder brother, Romuald, and Arechis himself died. Grimoald III, who was being held hostage by Charlemagne, succeeded as prince of Benevento. Unwisely, Charlemagne released Grimoald in return for an oath of loyalty. Grimoald did not keep his promise; by c. 791, he had effectively proclaimed himself independent and successfully resisted the Franks. Grimoald later tried to throw off Frankish suzerainty, but Charlemagne's sons, Pepin of Italy and Charles the Younger, forced him to submit in 792.

Notes

Bibliography

Einhard. The Life of Charlemagne. Translated by Samuel Epes Turner.

730s births
787 deaths

Year of birth uncertain
Dukes of Benevento

Lombard warriors
Princes of Benevento
8th-century rulers in Europe
8th-century Lombard people